For conflicts in the Arab League, see the following lists:

List of modern conflicts in the Middle East
List of modern conflicts in North Africa
List of conflicts in Somalia

Arab world-related lists
Arab League